In late January 2015, Scott Walker set up a 527 organization called Our American Revival. The organization has leased space at 2775 86th St. in Urbandale, Iowa, which is also known as the GOP's Des Moines Victory Office. Mitt Romney used the same location for his 2012 Iowa presidential campaign.

OAR coordinated and paid for Walker's extensive travel around the country, including a number of visits to Iowa and New Hampshire.

Governance
Rick Wiley is executive director.
Kirsten Kukowski, communication director, Kukowski has been deputy communications director/press secretary for the Republican National Committee, and also worked on the 2008 McCain presidential campaign, Illinois Sen. Mark Kirk's election in 2010.
Matt Mason, political director
David Polyansky is senior Iowa adviser. Polynski us president and CEO of Tarrance Group.
Ed Goeas, senior advisor.    
Brian Tringali, will oversee polling, he is a partner at Tarrance Group
B.J. Martino will oversee polling and is Senior VP of Tarrance Group
Mark Stephenson, chief data officer. Stephenson worked on Joni Ernst's Iowa Senate campaign among others

Tringali and Martino have worked for Walker in his previous gubernatorial campaigns.

Several members of the Tarrance Group will conduct polling and provide strategic political advice to Walker.

See also
 501(c)(4) organizations
 527 group
 Campaign finance in the United States
 Issue advocacy ads
 Lobbying in the United States
 Money loop
 Politics of the United States
 Soft money
 Republican Party presidential candidates, 2016
 Scott Walker presidential campaign, 2016
 Unintimidated (PAC)
 Wisconsin Club for Growth

References

External links

527 organizations
Organizations established in 2015
2015 establishments in Iowa